Sound Pieces is an album by American jazz composer, conductor and arranger Oliver Nelson featuring performances recorded in 1966 for the Impulse! label.

Reception
The Allmusic review by Scott Yanow awarded the album 4 stars, stating: "Although best-known as an altoist and a tenor-saxophonist, Nelson sticks exclusively to soprano throughout the set. He leads a 20-piece big band on three of his compositions. Although one would not think of Nelson as a soprano stylist, his strong playing actually put him near the top of his field".

Track listing
All compositions by Oliver Nelson except as indicated

 "Sound Piece for Jazz Orchestra" - 9:44
 "Flute Salad" - 2:49
 "The Lady From Girl Talk" - 4:59
 "The Shadow of Your Smile" (Mandel, Webster) - 9:44
 "Patterns" - 6:19
 "Elegy for a Duck" - 6:23

Bonus tracks on CD reissue:
"Straight, No Chaser" (Monk) - 9:10
 "Example Seventy Eight" - 6:01

Recorded on September 7, 1966 (#4-8) and September 27, 1966 (#3) and September 28, 1966 (#1, 2).

Personnel
Tracks 1-3
Oliver Nelson - soprano saxophone, arranger, conductor
John Audino, Bobby Bryant (#1-2), Conte Candoli, Ollie Mitchell, Al Porcino (#3) - trumpet
Mike Barone, Billy Byers (#3), Richard Leith, Dick Noel (#1-2), Ernie Tack - trombone
Bill Hinshaw, Richard Perissi - French horn
Red Callender - tuba
Gabe Baltazar - alto saxophone, clarinet, alto flute
Bill Green - piccolo, flute, alto flute, alto saxophone
Plas Johnson - tenor saxophone, bass clarinet, flute, alto flute
Bill Perkins - tenor saxophone, bass clarinet, flute, alto flute
Jack Nimitz - baritone saxophone, bass clarinet
Mike Melvoin - piano
Ray Brown – bass
Shelly Manne – drums
Recorded in Hollywood

Tracks 4-8
Oliver Nelson - soprano saxophone
Steve Kuhn - piano
Ron Carter – bass
Grady Tate – drums
Recorded in New York

References

Impulse! Records albums
Oliver Nelson albums
1967 albums
Albums produced by Bob Thiele
Albums conducted by Oliver Nelson
Albums arranged by Oliver Nelson